Microsoft Certified Professional was a certification program from Microsoft.

Overview 
Microsoft Certifications are earned by passing exams aligned to a specific certification. The process of earning certification has changed multiple times since its inception.

The current iteration was introduced in February 2020, when Microsoft announced that it was retiring all existing Microsoft Certified Professional (MCP), Microsoft Certified Solutions Developer (MCSD), Microsoft Certified Solutions Expert (MCSE) and Microsoft Certified Solutions Associate (MCSA) certifications, introducing new pathways, and changing the way individuals earn and maintain those Microsoft certifications. Under the new process, the number and selection of exams required to achieve a Microsoft certification varies.

These certifications were planned to be phased out effective June 30, 2020 in favor of "role-based" certifications focused primarily on Azure and Microsoft 365. However, on March 26, 2020, Microsoft announced that the remaining exams associated with MCSA, MCSE and MCSD will retire on January 31, 2021.

Historically, MCSE and MCSD credentials required the individual to recertify after a period of two to three years in order to keep the credential in the "Active section" of their transcript. Under the new system, the MCSE and MCSD credentials no longer have a recertification requirement, they remain on the "Active transcript" of the holder, once gained. Individuals instead can now re-earn a certification every year by passing an additional elective exam. It was done to reflect the increasing cadence of updates to Microsoft products and services, where products like Microsoft Azure are adding new features every 48 hours.

Certifications
The current list of Certifications are:
Fundamentals
Microsoft Technology Associate (MTA)
Microsoft Certified Educator (MCE)
Microsoft Office Specialist (MOS)
Role-based:
Microsoft Azure
Microsoft 365
Dynamics 365
Microsoft Power Platform
Microsoft Teams
Specialty:
Windows Virtual Desktop Specialty
Azure IoT Developer Specialty
Azure for SAP Workloads Specialty

Notable graduates
Rimi Nishimoto – Japanese voice actress (Word and Excel)

See also
Microsoft Technology Associate

References

 
Information technology qualifications